Lollipop sequence numbering is a numbering scheme used in routing protocols. In this numbering scheme, sequence numbers start at a negative value, increase until they reach zero, then cycle through a finite set of positive numbers indefinitely. When a system is rebooted, the sequence is restarted from a negative number again. This allows recently rebooted systems to be distinguished from systems which have simply looped around their numbering space.  This path can be visualized as a line with a circle at the end; hence a lollipop.

Lollipop sequence numbering was originally believed to resolve the ambiguity problem in cyclic sequence numbering schemes, and was used in OSPF version 1 for this reason. Later work showed that this was not the case, like in the ARPANET sequence bug, and OSPF version 2 replaced it with a linear numbering space, with special rules for what happens when the sequence numbers reach the end of the numbering space.

References
 R. Perlman. "Fault-Tolerant Broadcasting of Routing Information." Computer Networks, Vol. 7, December 1983, pp. 395–405.

External links
 Powerpoint presentation on routing protocols
 Cisco press article on routing protocols, contains discussion of lollipop numbering, and its failure to resolve ambiguity
 Mailing list post on vulnerabilities of lollipop approach

Identifiers
Routing protocols